King Stag is a feature film directed by Pavel Arsenov based on the musical play of the same name by Carlo Gozzi, and shot at the Gorky Film Studio in 1969. In the film, songs are played to the music of Mikael Tariverdiev performed by Alla Pugacheva, Yury Yakovlev, Sergei Yursky, Oleg Yefremov, Oleg Tabakov. It was a classic of children's cinema in the Soviet Union.

Plot 
Deramo, kind but simple-hearted king of Serendippe, wishes to marry. There is a problem: how to find out which of the contenders for his loves is genuine and which is simply eyeing the royal throne. The wizard Durandarte gives the king a figure of a clown who laughs if someone utters an untruth. The clown appears similar to the favorite of the king, the crafty and mean first minister Tartaglia, who for a long time and unrequitedly was in love with Angela, the daughter of the second minister, Pantalone, a timid bureaucrat. But Angela loves Deramo, though she will not be his bride, considering marriage unnecessary and humiliating. Tartaglia hatches intrigues and in every possible way interferes with his daughter Clarice marrying young, handsome chamberlain Leandra, Angela's brother, expecting to give the hand of his daughter to the king.  Despite all the tricks of the first minister, the king, by the audacity and sharpness of Angela, manages to discern her true love for him, falls in love with her and declares her his wife. Tartaglia is, however, unrelenting: while hunting, he learns from a friend the spell of Durandarte and swaps bodies with him.

Cast 
 Yury Yakovlev as Deramo
 Valentina Malyavina as Angela (vocals Alla Pugacheva)
 Sergey Yursky as Tartaglia
 Vladimir Shlesinger as Pantalone
 Oleg Tabakov as Chigolotti
 Oleg Yefremov as Durandarte
 Elena Solovey as Clarice
 Viktor Zozulin as Leander
 Vladimir Grammatikov as Zanni
 Alla Budnitskaya as Serendipist girl

Songs 
 Cavatina Durandarte
 Cavatina Angela
 Duet of Angela and Pantalone
 Song of the Serendipist girls
 Duet of Deramo and Angela
 Tartaglia Aria
 Reply from Durandarte
 Ballad of Angela
 The duo Clarice and Leander
 A Song About Evil and Good Wizards
 Cavatina Chigolotti
 Song of the Guards

References

External links 
 
 Тайны кино. Король-олень (2018)
 Репертуар художественной самодеятельности

1969 films
Gorky Film Studio films
Body swapping in films
Soviet musical films
Russian children's fantasy films
Films based on works by Carlo Gozzi
Soviet children's films
1960s Russian-language films